Kelly Corrigan (born August 16, 1967) is an American writer. She is a graduate of the University of Richmond and received a Masters in Literature from San Francisco State University. She is the host of Exactly, a 2017 series where top thinkers take on big ideas. Season One's guests included Margaret Atwood, Walter Isaacson, BJ Novak, Jason Segel and John Cleese. She is also the host of Kelly Corrigan Wonders, a Public Radio series, originating from WHYY in Philadelphia, that ponders “the big questions” with guests like Melinda Gates. She is the host in the interview show Tell Me More With Kelly Corrigan which premiered in October, 2020 on PBS and has had, as of May 1, 2021, three episodes with activist Bryan Stevenson (Ep. 1), entertainer James Corden (Ep. 2) and actress Jennifer Garner (Ep. 3).

Writing 
Corrigan's first book, The Middle Place, is a memoir about her Irish-American father's battle with cancer and her own triumph over the disease. It was published on January 8, 2008 (hardcover) and December 23, 2008 (paperback). At its peak, the hardcover reached No. 2 on the Non-fiction New York Times bestseller list. The paperback has reached No. 2 on the Trade Paperback Non-fiction New York Times bestseller list to date. "The Middle Place" was also recognized by Barnes and Noble as part of the "Discover Great New Writers" campaign.

Her second book, Lift, published in 2010, which also reached No. 2 on the New York Times bestseller list, is written in the form of a letter to her children, and is an examination of risk and parenthood through the lens of 3 true stories.

Corrigan is also the author of an essay about "women's remarkable capacity to support each other, to laugh together, and to endure" called Transcending, a reading of which by the author and released by Hyperion / everywomansvoice.com became a YouTube sensation. The video has received over 4 million views on YouTube to date.

Works

Nonfiction
The Middle Place (2008)
Lift (2010)
Glitter and Glue (2014)
Tell Me More (2018)

References

External links 
 
 Transcending, YouTube

American memoirists
American columnists
Living people
1967 births
American women memoirists
American women columnists
American people of Irish descent
University of Richmond alumni
San Francisco State University alumni
21st-century American women